Matech Concepts was an auto racing development firm based in Geneva, Switzerland and founded by Martin Bartek in 2006. The company had made an agreement with Ford Racing to develop the Ford GT sports car for competition, and constructs the FIA GT1 and GT3 versions of the GT at a workshop in Mayen, Germany. Matech was also the official European distributor of parts for the Ford Mustang FR500 racing cars developed by Multimatic Motorsports.
Matech's vehicles competed in several national series including the British GT Championship, Belcar, GT3 Brasil Championship, VLN, as well as the FIA GT3 European Championship and FIA GT1 World Championship.

Matech also had their own race team which competed in the FIA GT3 Championship under the title of Matech GT Racing, and in the FIA GT1 Championship as well as at the 24 Hours of Le Mans under the title of Matech Competition.  Matech GT Racing were the 2008 FIA GT3 Teams Champions in their second year of involvement in the series.
The Matech companies ceased business operations prior to the start of the 2011 racing season.

References

External links
 Matech Concepts 
 Matech Competition

Swiss auto racing teams
Auto racing teams established in 2006
2006 establishments in Switzerland
FIA GT1 World Championship teams
FIA GT Championship teams
ADAC GT Masters teams
European Le Mans Series teams
British GT Championship teams
Swiss racecar constructors

Ford in motorsport
24 Hours of Le Mans teams
Auto racing teams disestablished in 2011
2011 disestablishments in Switzerland